Kalakshetra Foundation, formerly simply Kalakshetra, is an arts and cultural academy dedicated to the preservation of traditional values in Indian art and crafts, especially in the field of Bharatanatyam dance and Gandharvaveda music. Based in Chennai, India, the academy was founded in January 1936 by Rukmini Devi Arundale and her husband George Arundale. Under Arundale's guidance, the institution achieved national and international recognition for its unique style and perfectionism. In 1962, Kalakshetra moved to a new campus in Besant Nagar, Chennai, occupying  of land.

In January 1994, an Act of the Parliament of India recognised the Kalakshetra Foundation as an "Institute of National Importance." The current Chairman of Kalakshetra is S. Ramadorai and the current director is Revathi Ramachandran.

History

Kalakshetra, later known as the Kalakshetra Foundation, was established by Rukmini Devi Arundale, along with her husband, George Arundale, a well-known theosophist, in Adyar, Chennai, in 1936. She invited not only the best students but also noted teachers, musicians and artists to be a part of this institution. In 1944, the University of Madras granted its affiliation for conducting diploma courses in Music, Dance and Painting & Crafts.

Year-long celebrations, including lectures, seminars and festivals marked her 100th birth anniversary, on 29 February 2004, at Kalakshetra and elsewhere in many parts of the world. Also on 29 February, a photo exhibition on her life opened at the Lalit Kala Gallery in New Delhi, and President A. P. J. Abdul Kalam released a photo-biography, written and compiled by Sunil Kothari, with a foreword by former president Ramaswamy Venkataraman. In 2016, marking its 80th year, the Kalakshetra Foundation held a 'Remembering Rukmini Devi’ festival of music and dance.

Kalakshetra style
Having studied the Pandanallur style for three years, in 1936 Rukmini Devi Arundale started working on developing her own, Kalakshetra, style of Bharatanatyam. She introduced group performances and staged various Bharatanatyam-based ballets.

The Kalakshetra style is noted for its angular, straight, ballet-like kinesthetics, and its avoidance of Recakas and of the uninhibited throw (Ksepa) of the limbs.

According to Sankara Menon (1907–2007), who was her associate from Kalakshetra's beginnings, Rukmini Devi raised Bharatanatyam to a puritan art form, divorced from its recently controversial past by "removing objectionable elements" (mostly, the Sringara, certain emotional elements evocative of the erotic, such as hip, neck, lip and chest movements) from the Pandanallur style, which was publicly criticized by Indian dancer Tanjore Balasaraswati (1918–1984)  and other representatives of Tamil Nadu's traditional Isai Velalar culture. Love outside parameters considered "chaste" was not to be portrayed. Balasaraswati said that "the effort to purify Bharatanatyam through the introduction of novel ideas is like putting a gloss on burnished gold or painting the lotus". Lawyer and classical artist E. Krishna Iyer (1897–1968) said about Rukmini Devi, "There is no need to say that before she entered the field, the art was dead and gone or that it saw a renaissance only when she started to dance or that she created anything new that was not there before".

Institutes

 Rukmini Devi College of Fine Arts
 Rukmini Devi Museum
 Koothambalam (Kalakshetra theatre)
 Craft Education and Research Centre (including the weaving department, the Kalamkari natural dye printing and the painting unit)

Notable alumni

Notable alumni include Radha Burnier,  Amala Akkineni, Kamaladevi Chattopadhyay, Sanjukta Panigrahi, C.V. Chandrasekhar, Dhananjayans,  Adyar K. Lakshman, Jayashree Narayanan, Leela Samson, Satyavati Motiram Sirsat, Jaya Thyagarajan, Devoleena Bhattacharjee, and Ananda Shankar Jayant.

References

Bibliography
 Fredericks, Leo: Poet in Kalakshetra. Madras 1977
 Kalakshetra Foundation (Hrsg.): Kalakshetra Brochure
 Nachiappan, C.: Rukmini Devi, Bharata Natya. Kalakshetra Publications, Chennai 2003
 Nachiappan, C.: Rukmini Devi, Dance Drama. Kalakshetra Publications, Chennai 2003
 Ramani, Shakuntala: Sari, the Kalakshetra tradition. Kalakshetra Foundation, Chennai 2002
 Sarada, S.: Kalakshetra-Rukmini Devi, reminiscences. Kala Mandir Trust, Madras 1985

External links

 Kalakshetra official website

Culture of Chennai
Cultural centres in Chennai
Theosophy
Dance schools in India
Arts organizations established in 1936
Organisations based in Tamil Nadu
Carnatic music
Ministry of Culture (India)
Art schools in India
Music schools in India
Academic institutions formerly affiliated with the University of Madras
1936 establishments in India
Bharatanatyam
Bharatanatyam styles
Bharatanatyam dance schools